Luwamo Garcia (born 1 May 1985) is a former professional footballer. Born in Angola, he is a Belgian youth international and has appeared at all levels from under-16 to under-21. At club level, he played in Belgium, the Netherlands, Greece, Cyprus and his native Angola.

Career
Born in Luanda, Angola, Garcia made his debut in professional football, being part of the Genk squad in the 2003–04 season. He also played for VVV-Venlo before joining RKC Waalwijk. Afterwards he played in Angola for Caála and Progresso Sambizanga. From January 2015, Garcia played for Tilleur in Belgium. In 2016, he moved to Bressoux. During a practice session, he suffered a transient ischemic attack which left him impaired in speech and movement for some time after. This forced him to retire from football.

Post-retirement
After his retirement from professional football, Garcia owned a transport company and worked for FedEx and TNT Express.

References

External links
 Player profile at Voetbal International

1985 births
Living people
Angolan footballers
Angolan expatriate footballers
Belgian footballers
Belgian expatriate footballers
K.R.C. Genk players
Belgian Pro League players
VVV-Venlo players
RKC Waalwijk players
Eerste Divisie players
Eredivisie players
Ethnikos Asteras F.C. players
Alki Larnaca FC players
Cypriot First Division players
Association football forwards
Expatriate footballers in the Netherlands
Expatriate footballers in Greece
Expatriate footballers in Cyprus
Angolan expatriate sportspeople in the Netherlands
Angolan expatriate sportspeople in Cyprus
Angolan expatriate sportspeople in Greece
Belgium youth international footballers
Belgium under-21 international footballers
C.R. Caála players
R.F.C. Tilleur players
Progresso Associação do Sambizanga players